Fight for Your Mind is the second album by Ben Harper. Released on August 1, 1995,  it was his last solo album before adding the Innocent Criminals to his line-up.  Reviews were generally very positive, praising Harper's fusion of multiple genres, from folk ("Another Lonely Day"), folk rock ("Gold to Me"), and politically charged reggae ("Excuse Me Mr.").

After Harper's well-received debut, Welcome to the Cruel World, he expanded on his fanbase by touring relentlessly with jam bands like Dave Matthews Band.  On this, his second album, Harper added a more refined sense of his own intense spirituality, such as on the gospel-influenced album closers, "Power of the Gospel", "God Fearing Man" and "One Road to Freedom".

Track listing
All songs written by Ben Harper except as noted.
"Oppression" 2:58
"Ground on Down" – 4:53
"Another Lonely Day" – 3:43
"Please Me Like You Want To" – 4:55
"Gold to Me" – 5:00
"Burn One Down" – 3:31
"Excuse Me Mr." (Harper, Jean-Pierre Plunier) – 5:24
"People Lead" – 4:13
"Fight for Your Mind" – 4:06
"Give a Man a Home" – 3:35
"By My Side" – 3:34
"Power of the Gospel" – 6:02
"God Fearing Man" – 11:49
"One Road to Freedom" – 4:14

Artwork
The Fight For Your Mind cover features Harper's face on fire, as the artwork features the use of military roundels from African nations (plus Jamaica) to represent each track on the album. The track corresponding to each roundel is:
Angola - Oppression 
Cameroon - Ground on Down
Central African Republic - Another Lonely Day
Chad - Please Me Like You Want To
Uganda - Gold to Me
Jamaica - Burn One Down
Egypt - Excuse Me Mr
Niger - People Lead
Ghana/Guinea - Fight For Your Mind
Kenya - Give a Man a Home
Nigeria - By My Side
Somalia - Power of the Gospel
Ivory Coast - God Fearing Man
Ethiopia - One Road to Freedom

Harper has continued to use roundel inspired artwork on his other albums.

Personnel
Ben Harper - acoustic guitar, Vocals, weissenborn
Brett Banduci - viola
Danielle Charles - violin
Oliver Charles - drums
Bob "Stiv" Coke - tabla, tambourine, tamboura, sarod
Timothy Loo - cello
Leon Mobley - percussion
Juan Nelson - bass
Ervin Pope - organ, Hammond organ

Production
Producers: Ben Harper, Bob "Stiv" Coke, J.P. Plunier
Associate Producer: Jeff Gottlieb
Assistant Producer: Jeff Gottlieb
Engineer: Bradley Cook
Assistant engineers: Ryan Boesh, Todd Burke, Paul Naguna
Mixing: The Dub Brothers, Femi Jiya, Eric Sarafin
Mastering: Eddy Schreyer
String arrangements: Ben Harper, J.P. Plunier
Design: Tom Dolan
Art direction: Tom Dolan, J.P. Plunier
Photography: Bob "Stiv" Coke, Jeff Gottlieb
Research: Ben Elder

Certifications and sales

References

1995 albums
Ben Harper albums
Virgin Records albums